Capperia celeusi is a moth of the family Pterophoridae. It is known from most of Europe, Ukraine, Russia, Turkey, Lebanon, Turkmenistan and the United Arab Emirates.

The wingspan is 14–17 mm.

The larvae feed on  wall germander (Teucrium chamaedrys) and probably Teucrium stocksianum.

References

Oxyptilini
Moths described in 1886
Plume moths of Asia
Plume moths of Europe
Taxa named by Heinrich Frey